John Wedderburn may refer to:
 John Wedderburn (poet), Scottish poet and theologian
 Sir John Wedderburn of Ballindean, Scottish landowner and planter
 Sir John Wedderburn, 5th Baronet of Blackness, joined the 1745 rebellion of Charles Edward Stuart